Prayagraj Rambagh Railway Stationis situated in the Rambagh area of Prayagraj in the Indian state of Uttar Pradesh. It also a Terminal station of Prayagraj. Due to huge rush at Prayagraj Junction the railway will develop as a high facilitated terminal.

History
The Prayagraj-Mau-Gorakhpur main line was constructed as a -wide metre-gauge line by the Bengal and North Western Railway between 1899 and 1913. It was converted to -wide  broad gauge in 1993–94.

References

Railway stations in Allahabad
Varanasi railway division